Oscar Früh (25 May 1891 – 11 October 1949) was a Swiss painter. His work was part of the painting event in the art competition at the 1924 Summer Olympics.

References

External links
 

1891 births
1949 deaths
19th-century Swiss painters
20th-century Swiss painters
Swiss male painters
Olympic competitors in art competitions
People from Bülach District
19th-century Swiss male artists
20th-century Swiss male artists